Andrés Orlando Rebottaro (born 5 September 1952 in Rosario) is a former Argentine football defender who played most of his career for Newell's Old Boys.

Club career
Rebottaro came through the Newell's Old Boys youth system to make his professional debut in 1970. In 1974 he was part of the team that won the Metropolitano championship. He made 250 appearances for the club between 1970 and 1978.

In 1979, he played for Boca Juniors, he wound down his playing career with Club Atlético Tigre in 1980 and Colón de Santa Fe in 1981.

International career
Rebottaro played for the Argentina national team in the 1970s including appearances in the Copa América 1975

Managerial career
Rebottaro worked as the manager of Atlético Tucumán in the 1990s and in 1999 he became manager of Newell's Old Boys in the Argentine Primera.

In 2003, he returned to Atlético Tucumán where he led the team to the Torneo Argentino A Clausura championship in 2003. In 2004, he took over as the manager of Aldosivi and led them to the Torneo Argentino A Clausura 2005 championship and promotion to the Argentine 2nd division.

In 2005, he returned to Atlético Tucumán and in 2007 he joined Aldosivi again as youth team coach, only to take over as manager in October 2007. In 2010, he joined Talleres de Córdoba

References

External links
Andrés Rebottaro at BDFA.com.ar 

1952 births
Living people
Footballers from Rosario, Santa Fe
Argentine footballers
Argentina international footballers
1975 Copa América players
Association football defenders
Newell's Old Boys footballers
Boca Juniors footballers
Club Atlético Tigre footballers
Club Atlético Colón footballers
Argentine football managers
Atlético Tucumán managers
Newell's Old Boys managers
Talleres de Córdoba managers
Aldosivi managers
Argentine Primera División players
Pan American Games medalists in football
Pan American Games gold medalists for Argentina
Footballers at the 1971 Pan American Games
Medalists at the 1971 Pan American Games